Larry Christopher Jermaine Tripplett (born January 18, 1979) is a former American football defensive tackle. He was originally drafted by the Indianapolis Colts in the second round of the 2002 NFL Draft. He played college football at Washington.

Tripplett also played for the Buffalo Bills and the Seattle Seahawks.

References

External links
Washington Huskies bio

1979 births
Living people
Westchester High School (Los Angeles) alumni
Players of American football from Los Angeles
American football defensive tackles
Washington Huskies football players
Indianapolis Colts players
Buffalo Bills players
Seattle Seahawks players